Wiklander is a Swedish surname. Notable people with this surname include:

 Ann-Cathrine Wiklander (born 1958), Swedish singer
 David Boo Wiklander (born 1984), Swedish football player
 Iwar Wiklander (born 1939), Swedish actor
 Johan Wiklander (born 1981), Swedish ice hockey player
 Lars-Göran Wiklander (born 1970), Swedish ice hockey player
 Raymond Wiklander, Swedish figure skater